Juglans major (literally, the larger walnut), also known as Arizona walnut, is a walnut tree which grows to  with a DBH of up to  at elevations of  in Texas, Oklahoma, New Mexico, Arizona, and Utah.  It also occurs in Mexico as far south as Guerrero. Common names include Arizona black walnut (as it belongs to the "black walnuts" section Juglans sect. Rhysocaryon), and the Spanish name nogal cimarrón  (cimarron walnut).

Description
In moister areas, the tree features a single, stout trunk; there are usually several slender trunks in drier situations. The small nut has a thick shell with deep grooves enclosing an oily, edible seed.

Where the range of J. major overlaps that of J. microcarpa, the two interbreed, producing many intermediate forms.

References

External links

major
Trees of the Southwestern United States
Flora of the South-Central United States
Trees of Mexico
Plants described in 1853